J.A. Martin Photographer is a 1977 Canadian drama film directed by Jean Beaudin. It was entered into the 1977 Cannes Film Festival, where Monique Mercure won the award for Best Actress. The film won multiple Canadian Film Awards, including best feature film. It was selected as the Canadian entry for the Best Foreign Language Film at the 50th Academy Awards, but was not accepted as a nominee. In 1984, the Toronto International Film Festival ranked the film seventh in the Top 10 Canadian Films of All Time.

Synopsis
Photographer Joseph-Albert Martin is going on a tour to the hard Canadian countryside at the turn of the 20th century. His wife decides to go, with the hope that the intimacy will help revive their marriage.

Cast

Production
The film had a budget of $488,014.

Reception
Monique Mercure won the Cannes Film Festival Award for Best Actress at the 1977 Cannes Film Festival. The film was seen by 103,880 people in France.

See also
 List of submissions to the 50th Academy Awards for Best Foreign Language Film
 List of Canadian submissions for the Academy Award for Best Foreign Language Film

References

Works cited

External links

Watch J.A. Martin photographe (original French-language version), National Film Board of Canada website

1977 films
1977 drama films
Canadian drama films
1970s French-language films
Films directed by Jean Beaudin
National Film Board of Canada films
Best Picture Genie and Canadian Screen Award winners
Films set in Quebec
Films scored by Maurice Blackburn
French-language Canadian films
1970s Canadian films